Meropalpus is a genus of beetles in the family Carabidae, containing the following species:

 Meropalpus azurescens Straneo, 1943
 Meropalpus irradians Tschitscherine, 1900
 Meropalpus nobilis (Brulle, 1843)

References

Pterostichinae